KMU may refer to:

Kabinet Ministriv Ukrainy (Кабінет Міністрів України), the Cabinet of Ministers of Ukraine
Kanazawa Medical University, a private university in Ishikawa, Japan
Kansai Medical University, a private university in Osaka, Japan
Kaohsiung Medical University, a private university in Kaohsiung, Taiwan
Karl-Marx-Universität, former name of Leipzig University in Germany
 Kauno Medicinos Universiteto (Kaunas University of Medicine), now part of Lithuanian University of Health Sciences
Keimyung University, a private university in South Korea
Khyber Medical University, a public research university in Peshawar, Pakistan
Kilusang Mayo Uno, a Philippines labor organization
Kookmin University, a private university in South Korea
Karamanoglu Mehmetbey University, a public university in Karaman, Turkey
Kumbakonam railway station (Indian Railways station code), a railway station in Tamil Nadu, India
Kadyos, manok, kag ubad, a Filipino chicken soup with pigeon peas and banana pith